The Krasniye Kryl'ya Deltacraft MD-40 is a Russian ultralight trike, designed and produced by Krasniye Kryl'ya of Taganrog. The aircraft is supplied as a complete ready-to-fly-aircraft.

Design and development
It features a cable-braced hang glider-style high-wing, weight-shift controls, a single seat open cockpit with a streamlined cockpit fairing, retractable tricycle landing gear and a single engine in pusher configuration.

The aircraft fuselage is made from composites, with its aluminum-framed double surface wing covered in Dacron sailcloth. The wing is supported by a single tube-type kingpost and uses an "A" frame weight-shift control bar. The powerplant is a twin cylinder, air-cooled, two-stroke, dual-ignition  Rotax 503 engine.

A number of different wings can be fitted to the basic carriage, including a wing with an area of  produced by the company.

Specifications (Deltacraft MD-40)

References

External links

Photo of the Krasniye Kryl'ya Deltacraft MD-40

2000s Russian sport aircraft
2000s Russian ultralight aircraft
Single-engined pusher aircraft
Ultralight trikes